Centrolene notosticta (common name: cordillera giant glass frog) is a species of frog in the family Centrolenidae. It is found on the Cordillera Oriental in Colombia (Cundinamarca, Boyacá, Santander, and Norte de Santander departments) and on its extension to north, Serranía del Perijá, in the Zulia state in Venezuela.

Description
Males measure  in snout–vent length. They have a truncate snout and shagreen dorsum with spinules.

Centrolene notosticta is one of the few Centroleninae species in which females place egg clutches on undersides of leaves.

Habitat and conservation
The species' natural habitats are old growth cloud forests where it occurs on streamside vegetation. Tadpoles develop in water. Its elevational range is  asl.

It is an abundant species. Habitat loss and introduced species (trout) are threats, although it is not considered threatened as a whole.

References

notosticta
Amphibians of the Andes
Amphibians of Colombia
Amphibians of Venezuela
Amphibians described in 1991
Taxa named by John Douglas Lynch
Taxonomy articles created by Polbot